Donald Dickie (born 8 May 1972 in New Zealand) is a former professional Australian rules footballer notable for his brief appearance in the Australian Football League for the Port Adelaide Football Club. Dickie was born in New Zealand  of a Māori heritage, he is one of few Maori Australians in the history of the VFL/AFL. His family emigrated to South Australia where he played with the Norwood Football Club.

AFL career

Port Adelaide career (1997 - 2000)
Dickie was taken at Pick #19 in the pre-season AFL draft as a zone selection.

The wingman became a cult player at Port Adelaide known for his exciting dashing play and hard tackles. At the end of the 1998 AFL season he earned runner up in the John Cahill Medal.

After inconsistent form and complications with ankle injuries Dickie was delisted by the power at the end of 2000 having played a total of 55 games.

SANFL career

Coaching career
Dickie was an assistant coach with the Sturt Football Club in the SANFL.

References

1972 births
Living people
VFL/AFL players born outside Australia
Australian rules footballers from South Australia
Port Adelaide Football Club players
Port Adelaide Football Club players (all competitions)
Norwood Football Club players
New Zealand players of Australian rules football
New Zealand emigrants to Australia
Sturt Football Club players
Australian people of Māori descent